Taguaí is a municipality in the state of São Paulo in Brazil. The population is 14,141 (2020 est.) in an area of 145 km2. The elevation is 575 m.

References

Municipalities in São Paulo (state)